Rodney Thomas Franz (February 8, 1925 – November 27, 1999) was an American football player and coach. He played college football as a guard at the University of California, Berkeley from 1946 to 1949. As a senior, he was a unanimous selection on the 1949 College Football All-America Team. Franz was the first head football coach at University of California, Riverside, serving for one season, in 1955, and compiling a record of 1–3–1. He was inducted into the College Football Hall of Fame as player in 1977.

Franz began his coaching career in 1951 at Mount Diablo High School in Concord, California, where was head football coach for four seasons. He returned to his alma mater, California, after his stint at UC Riverside and was an assistant football coach there in 1956 and 1957. Franz later worked as a lobbyist for the East Bay Municipal Utility District. He died on November 27, 1999 after suffering from prostate cancer for nine years.

Head coaching record

References

External links
 
 

1925 births
1999 deaths
All-American college football players
American football guards
California Golden Bears football coaches
California Golden Bears football players
Coaches of American football from California
College Football Hall of Fame inductees
Deaths from cancer in California
Deaths from prostate cancer
High school football coaches in California
Players of American football from San Francisco
UC Riverside Highlanders football coaches